Dexterity is a 1988 live album by the jazz pianist George Shearing recorded at the second Fujitsu-Concord Jazz Festival. The singer Ernestine Anderson appears on two tracks. Shearing and Anderson would later record the album A Perfect Match.

Reception

Scott Yanow reviewed the album for Allmusic, describing it as "A well-rounded and consistently enjoyable program".

Track listing
 "Dexterity" (Charlie Parker) – 5:17
 "You Must Believe in Spring" (Alan and Marilyn Bergman, Jacques Demy, Michel Legrand) – 7:53
 "Sakura Sakura (Cherry Blossom)" (Traditional) – 5:13
 "Kjo No Tsuki" (Rentaro Taki) – 3:00
 "I Won't Dance" (Dorothy Fields, Otto Harbach, Oscar Hammerstein II, Jerome Kern, Jimmy McHugh) – 5:08
 "Long Ago (and Far Away)" (Ira Gershwin, Jerome Kern) – 5:03
 "Can't We Be Friends?" (Paul James, Kay Swift) – 3:08
 "As Long as I Live" (Harold Arlen, Ted Koehler) – 4:19
 "Please Send Me Someone to Love" (Percy Mayfield) – 6:49
 Duke Ellington medley: "Take the "A" Train"/"In a Sentimental Mood"/"Just Squeeze Me (But Please Don't Tease Me)"/"Satin Doll"/"Cotton Tail" (Billy Strayhorn)/(Duke Ellington, Manny Kurtz, Irving Mills)/(Ellington, Lee Gaines)/(Ellington, Strayhorn, Johnny Mercer)/(Ellington) – 7:21
 "Lullaby of Birdland" (George Shearing, George David Weiss) – 5:30

Personnel 
George Shearing – piano
Ernestine Anderson – vocals on "As Long As I Live" and "Please Send Me Someone to Love"
Neil Swainson – double bass
Carl Jefferson – producer
Kent Judkins – art direction
Chris Long – assistant producer
Tom Burgess – cover art concept
Hatsuro Takanami – engineer
Leonard Feather – liner notes
George Horn – mastering
K. Abe – photography
Kazumi Someya – project interpreter
Ron Davis – remixing
Allen Farnham – remote supervisor
Yoichi Nakao – technical coordinator

References

1988 live albums
Albums produced by Carl Jefferson
Concord Records live albums
George Shearing live albums